The Dinosaur Game (also known as the Chrome Dino) is a browser game developed by Google and built into the Google Chrome web browser. The player guides a pixelated Tyrannosaurus rex across a side-scrolling landscape, avoiding obstacles to achieve a higher score. The game was created by members of the Chrome UX team in 2014.

Gameplay 

When a user attempts to navigate to a web page on Google Chrome while being offline, the browser notifies the user that they are not connected to the Internet, with an illustration of a pixelated Tyrannosaurus rex shown on the page. Additionally, the game can be accessed by inputting chrome://dino or chrome://network-error/-106 into the Omnibox.

During the game, the Lonely T-Rex continuously moves from left to right across a black-and-white desert landscape, with the player attempting to avoid oncoming obstacles such as cacti and Pteranodons by jumping or ducking. As the game progresses, the speed of play gradually increases until the user hits an obstacle or a Pterosaur, prompting an instant game over.

Once the player reaches around 700 points, the game switches from dark gray graphics on a white background to pale gray graphics on a black background, representing a shift from day to night, with daytime sky graphics also becoming nighttime sky graphics. The color scheme then alternates as the game progresses. The game was designed to reach its maximum score after approximately 17million years of playtime, in reference to how long the T-Rex existed before it went extinct during the Cretaceous–Paleogene extinction event.

If a network administrator disables the Dinosaur Game, an error message appears when attempting to play the game, which features an image of a meteor heading towards the Lonely T-Rex.

Development 

The game was created by members of the Chrome UX team in 2014, which consisted of Sebastien Gabriel, Alan Bettes, and Edward Jung. Gabriel designed the player character, named the "Lonely T-Rex". During development, the game was given the codename "Project Bolan", in reference to Marc Bolan, the lead singer of the T. Rex band. The developers chose the dinosaur theme as a reference to the game's function, a joke that not having an internet connection is equivalent to living in the "prehistoric ages". The game was released in September 2014; initially, it did not work on older devices, so the code was updated and re-released in December of the same year. The pteranodons were added as obstacles with a browser update in 2015.

In September 2018, an Easter egg was added to the game in celebration of Chrome's 10th birthday and the game's fourth birthday, with a birthday cake appearing in the desert and a birthday hat appearing on the Lonely T-Rex if the cake is "eaten". In November of the same year, Google introduced a feature to save the player's high score. The game's source code is available on the Chromium site.

In 2021, Google introduced a widget in March for iOS 14 which led players to chrome://dino; a similar widget was introduced to Android later that year. In July, an Easter egg for the 2020 Tokyo Olympics simulating various Olympic activities was added.

Reception 
The game received widespread recognition, with the creators revealing in September 2018 that approximately 270million games were played monthly.

In popular culture 
The Dinosaur Game is referenced in the "couch gag" opening segment of the season 34 premiere of The Simpsons, "Habeas Tortoise".

Related media 
In May 2020, a Microsoft Edge update added Surf, a game where players control a surfer attempting to evade obstacles and collect powerups. Like the Dinosaur Game, it is accessible from an error page when the browser is offline. The game allows for character customization and multiple control schemes.

In August 2020, MSCHF and 100 Thieves partnered to create a modified version of the game titled Dino Swords, which featured a small arsenal of weapons and time-slowing pills; when mismanaged, the weapons could backfire and harm the dinosaur.

See also 
 List of Google Easter eggs

Notes

References 

2014 video games
Action video games
Dinosaurs in video games
Easter egg (media)
Endless runner games
Google Chrome
Google Chrome games
Monochrome video games
Video games developed in the United States